

Events 
November 13 – Lodovico Bassano marries Elizabeth Damon

Publications 
Costanzo Antegnati – Psalms for eight voices (Venice: Angelo Gardano)
Giammateo Asola
Cantus firmus masses for organ and choir (Venice: Giacomo Vincenti)
 for five voices (Venice:Ricciardo Amadino), also includes a Magnificat
Paolo Bellasio – Villanellas for three voices, with lute tablature (Venice: Angelo Gardano)
Valerio Bona – Second book of canzonettas for three voices (Venice: Ricciardo Amadino)
Giovanni Croce – Second book of madrigals for five voices (Venice: Giacomo Vincenti)
Thomas East (ed.) – The Whole Booke of Psalmes (London: Thomas East), contains new settings by English composers, including Edward Blancks, Edmund Hooper, and John Dowland
Tiburtio Massaino
 for six, seven, eight, nine, ten, and twelve voices in two or three choirs with instruments (Venice: Angelo Gardano)
First book of motets for four voices (Prague: Georg Nigrinus)
First book of motets for six voices (Venice: Angelo Gardano)
Philippe de Monte – Fifteenth book of madrigals for five voices (Venice: Angelo Gardano)
Claudio Monteverdi –  (Third book of madrigals for five voices) (Venice: Ricciardo Amadino)
Nicola Parma – Second book of madrigals for five and six voices (Venice: Ricciardo Amadino)
Riccardo Rognoni – . Venice.

Classical music 
none listed

Births 
date unknown
John Jenkins, English composer (died 1678)
Domenico Mazzocchi, Italian composer (died 1665)

Deaths 
February 29 – Alessandro Striggio, diplomat and composer (b. c. 1536)
May – Giovanni Domenico da Nola, Neapolitan poet and composer (born c. 1510)
May 24 – Nikolaus Selnecker, theologian and musician (b. 1532)
July 1 – Marc'Antonio Ingegneri, composer (b. c. 1547)
date unknown – Annibale Zoilo, singer and composer (b. c. 1537)

References

 
Music
16th century in music
Music by year